The Audi Avantissimo was a concept car made by the German automobile manufacturer Audi. The car debuted at the 2001 Frankfurt Motor Show and also appeared at the 2002 North American International Auto Show in Detroit. Audi planned the car to be luxurious and distinguished, but also very fast. Many of its styling cues are visible on the 2002 Audi A8.

The Avantissimo had a 4.2-litre V8 engine equipped with twin turbochargers. The car had a six-speed automatic transmission and quattro permanent four-wheel drive. It also featured an electrochromic roof.

This concept introduced much of the technology later available on the series production A8 D3, including Multi Media Interface, six-speed automatic transmission with shift paddles, a V8 biturbo engine (similar to the C5 RS6), self-levelling adaptive air suspension with continuously controlled damping, electric park brake, bi-xenon headlights with static Adaptive Front Lighting System (AFS) curve headlights, dashboard, and driver identification systems with fingerprint scanner.

References

External links
 Audi Corporate website

Audi concept vehicles